The 1977 Mississippi State Bulldogs football team represented Mississippi State University during the 1977 NCAA Division I football season. The Bulldogs finished 5–6 on the field, but were later forced to forfeit the wins due to having played an ineligible player.

Schedule

Personnel

References

Mississippi State
Mississippi State Bulldogs football seasons
Mississippi State Bulldogs football